Olaf Schmidt (born 1962) is a German glider aerobatic pilot.

He joined his gliding club, Bremer Verein für Luftfahrt e.V., at the age of 13, gaining his glider pilot licence at the age of 16 and a glider and his motor glider instructor rating in 1983 at the age of 21. Since 1984, he has assisted at glider aerobatic courses as a tow pilot. He obtained a glider aerobatics rating in 1987. In 1994 he competed in a glider aerobatic competition in the advanced category for the first time. The 1998 German National Championship was his first competition in the unlimited category.

He became a member of the German National Glider Aerobatics Team in 2001.  Since then he has competed in the European and in the World Glider Aerobatic Championships.

References 

Glider pilots
Aerobatic pilots
German aviators
1962 births
Living people
Place of birth missing (living people)